The Minister of Energy, Science and Technology was a cabinet position in the province of Manitoba, Canada, created in 2002.

The minister given certain responsibilities from the Ministry of Industry, Economic Development and Mines in September 2006, and renamed as the Ministry of Science, Technology, Energy and Mines.

List of Ministers of Energy, Science and Technology

References 

Manitoba
Energy, Science and Technology, Minister of